Ricardo Ribeiro de Andrade (born 22 June 1977) is a Brazilian football player who plays for Pinhalnovense.

Club career
He made his professional debut in the Segunda Liga for Leixões on 28 August 2010 in a game against Sporting Covilhã.

He made his Primeira Liga debut for Moreirense on 8 October 2012 when he started in a 0–1 loss against Marítimo.

References

External links

1977 births
Sportspeople from Rio de Janeiro (state)
Living people
Brazilian footballers
Centro de Futebol Zico players
Desportiva Ferroviária players
Sport Colombia footballers
Brazilian expatriate footballers
Expatriate footballers in Paraguay
An Giang FC players
Expatriate footballers in Vietnam
Friburguense Atlético Clube players
Esporte Clube Tigres do Brasil players
Santa Cruz Futebol Clube players
Clube Náutico Marcílio Dias players
Macaé Esporte Futebol Clube players
Associação Atlética Portuguesa (RJ) players
Ceilândia Esporte Clube players
America Football Club (RJ) players
Moreirense F.C. players
Expatriate footballers in Portugal
Leixões S.C. players
Liga Portugal 2 players
C.D. Fátima players
Primeira Liga players
C.D. Tondela players
U.D. Leiria players
C.D. Pinhalnovense players
Association football goalkeepers
F.C. Oliveira do Hospital players